New Jersey elected its members October 15, 1822.

See also 
 1822 and 1823 United States House of Representatives elections
 List of United States representatives from New Jersey

1822
New Jersey
United States House of Representatives